Oribotritia is a genus of mites in the family Oribotritiidae.

Species
 Oribotritia contortula Niedbała, 1993
 Oribotritia contraria Niedbała, 1993
 Oribotritia teretis Niedbała, 1993

References

Acari genera
Acari of New Zealand
Sarcoptiformes